Robert Thomas Taylor (born 21 October 1994) is a Finnish professional footballer who plays as a midfielder and wing-back for Major League Soccer club Inter Miami and the Finland national team.

Club career
Taylor joined the youth team at JJK in 2004, and stayed with the club until senior level. During this time, he had spells in the country of his father's birth, England, with Nottingham Forest and then Lincoln City, who he joined on a two-year scholarship in 2011. Taylor was loaned out to Boston Town of the United Counties League in 2013, where he made one appearance. Later in 2013, he joined Barnet, where he was due to sign a professional contract, but this fell through following their relegation from the English Football League.

Taylor played for JJK in the Ykkönen until 2015, when he joined Veikkausliiga side RoPS.

In July 2017, Taylor was sold to AIK for €100,000. He joined Tromsø on loan for the 2018 season, and then permanently for the 2019 season.

On 20 January 2020, Taylor penned a three-year deal with Brann, which saw Ruben Yttergård Jenssen go the other way.

On 11 February 2022, Taylor moved to Major League Soccer side Inter Miami on a two-year deal.

International career
Taylor has been capped by Finland at under-17, under-19, under-20, under-21 and senior level. He made his debut for the senior side on 9 January 2017 as a substitute in a 1–0 friendly win over Morocco.

On 11 October 2020, Taylor scored his first goal in a 2–0 UEFA Nations League victory over Bulgaria.

Personal life
Taylor's father Paul is an English former footballer who played for KuPS in the 1990s.

Career statistics

Club

International

International goals
As of match played on 4 June 2021. Finland score listed first, score column indicates score after each Taylor goal.

References

External links
Robert Taylor at the Brann website 

1994 births
Living people
Finnish people of English descent
Finnish footballers
Finland youth international footballers
Finland under-21 international footballers
Finland international footballers
Association football midfielders
JJK Jyväskylä players
Nottingham Forest F.C. players
Lincoln City F.C. players
Boston Town F.C. players
Barnet F.C. players
Rovaniemen Palloseura players
AIK Fotboll players
Tromsø IL players
SK Brann players
Inter Miami CF players
United Counties League players
Veikkausliiga players
Ykkönen players
Allsvenskan players
Eliteserien players
UEFA Euro 2020 players
Finnish expatriate footballers
Finnish expatriate sportspeople in Sweden
Expatriate footballers in Sweden
Finnish expatriate sportspeople in Norway
Expatriate footballers in Norway
Expatriate soccer players in the United States
Finnish expatriate sportspeople in the United States
Major League Soccer players
People from Kuopio
Sportspeople from North Savo